The Calnev Pipeline is a  long buried refined oil products pipeline in the United States, owned by Kinder Morgan Energy Partners. The lines carry gasoline, jet fuel, and diesel fuel from Los Angeles, California refineries as far as Nellis Air Force Base south of North Las Vegas, Nevada. Jet fuel from the pipeline is also delivered to the McCarran International Airport tank farm in Paradise. Additional terminal facilities are located in Barstow, California.

The line was the sole source for the products it delivers to Las Vegas until the Unev pipeline began operating in 2012.  UNEV provides access to refined oil products from Utah.

Accidents and incidents 
On December 22, 1980, the pipeline carrying jet fuel ruptured in the Las Vegas Valley, near Tropicana Avenue, spilling fuel for 2 hours. Later, the fuel ignited, forcing road closures. One firefighter was overcome by fumes. Between  of jet fuel were spilled. Prior construction in the area was suspected of damaging the pipeline.

On May 25, 1989, The San Bernardino train disaster: The Calnev Pipeline ruptured in a San Bernardino, California neighborhood, due to damage from the cleanup of a train derailment, that occurred thirteen days earlier. The resulting gasoline fire killed two people, destroyed eleven homes, and twenty-one cars.

Impacts

Environmental 
In 2010, Kinder Morgan proposed an expansion project which would add a third, 16-inch pipeline to accompany the two existing pipelines. Several organizations, as well as state government agencies, responded to the CalNev Expansion Project such as the Metropolitan Water District of Southern California and the Nevada Department of Wildlife. The project proposed building across Cajon Creek Conservation Area in San Bernardino which would affect over 20 sensitive species. Construction would alter the area's hydrological regime and pose a risk to the animals living in this area. Certain areas of the pipeline also require replacing depleted areas of cathodic protection, which protect the pipeline from rust and potential leaks. In 2015, the cathodic protection system of the pipeline that passes through the Mojave National Preserve needed to be repaired. This repair construction disrupts nearby habitats. However, to omit repair greatly increases the risk of an oil spill.

Route

The CalNev Pipeline begins in Los Angeles, California, runs through with terminal stops in San Bernardino County in the cities of Colton and Barstow and ends outside of Las Vegas, Nevada.

Regulations

Current 
All pipelines in the United States have to adhere to the regulations set forth by the U.S. Department of Transportation Pipeline and Hazardous Materials Safety Administration (PHMSA). PHMSA sets regulations pertaining to the operation, construction, expansion of pipelines, which private pipeline companies have to adhere to, with federal and state inspectors enforcement. Calnev is an interstate pipeline crossing California and Nevada therefore it’s managed by PMHSA and inspected by federal agents. However, portions of pipeline exclusively within California or Nevada could be inspected by respective State agencies. In 2016, there were seven broad system-wide program inspections and two targeted investigations intended to scrutinize certain safety features in regards to the pipeline. According to PMHSA’s Pipeline Safety Stakeholder Communications data, Calnev has had one case in the last ten years in which PHMSA issued a Corrective Action Order in 2004 against Kinder Morgan in regards to a failure in Calnev Pipeline which released gasoline to its environment, an order that was marked closed in 2007. There was no proposed and collected penalty.

Future 
Recently, President Donald Trump issued a key memorandum altering previous regulations regarding the construction of pipelines in the United States. Issued on January 24, 2017, this memorandum includes expediting the construction of future American pipelines, such as the Keystone XL Pipeline and the Dakota Access Pipeline, as well as high priority infrastructure projects. One of the key developments stated in this memorandum is that all future new and expanding pipelines to be constructed in the United States are to be built with materials “produced within the United States." In which case, the Calnev expansion project would need to add a new section in their proposal explaining what materials would be used for construction for the current proposal does not address this. Other important new regulations include those mentioned in the order to expedite environmental reviews and approvals on high priority infrastructure projects, which are defined by President Trump to include “critical...pipelines”. With this memorandum, the Chairman of White House Council on Environmental Quality (CEQ) has the power to decide whether a project is “high priority” or not within 30 days of receiving project requests in efforts to streamline the approval process.

Expansion plans 
On July 23, 2007, Kinder Morgan Energy Partners announced that it will expand the pipeline by constructing an additional  pipeline alongside the existing pipelines.

See also
 List of natural gas pipelines in North America
 List of oil pipelines in North America
 List of oil refineries in North America
 Pipeline transport

References

Oil pipeline companies
Refined oil product pipelines in the United States
Kinder Morgan
Energy infrastructure in California
Energy infrastructure in Nevada
Petroleum in California
Transportation in the Las Vegas Valley
Pipelines in California
Pipelines in Nevada